Emiliano Manuel Romay (born 25 February 1977) is an Argentine former footballer.

He played for Boca Juniors, OGC Nice and Santiago Wanderers.

Honours

Club
Santiago Wanderers
 Primera División de Chile (1): 2001

External links
 
 
 

1977 births
Living people
Argentine footballers
Argentine expatriate footballers
Boca Juniors footballers
Club Atlético Huracán footballers
Santiago Wanderers footballers
Expatriate footballers in Chile
Expatriate footballers in France
Expatriate footballers in Costa Rica
Argentina youth international footballers
Deportivo Saprissa players
Association football forwards
Sportspeople from Mar del Plata